Seeing Other People is the sixth studio album by American duo Foxygen. It was released on April 26, 2019 through Jagjaguwar.

Critical reception
Seeing Other People received generally favorable reviews from contemporary music critics. At Metacritic, which assigns a normalized rating out of 100 to reviews from mainstream critics, the album received an average score of 68, based on 10 reviews.

There was no tour for the album.

Track listing

References

2019 albums
Foxygen albums
Jagjaguwar albums
Albums produced by Jonathan Rado